Brickelliastrum is a North American genus of flowering plants in the tribe Eupatorieae within the family Asteraceae.  Brickelliastrum has at times been lumped with Brickellia or Steviopsis, but chromosome number (x=10) and molecular data are in agreement in showing that it is distinct from either of these. Despite having the general appearance of Brickellia, members of Brickelliastrum have cypselae that have only 5-7 ribs (vs. 10), funnel-shaped corollas, and a style with an unenlarged, glabrous base.

There is only one recognized species, Brickelliastrum fendleri. It is native to the southwestern United States (Arizona, New Mexico, and western Texas) and northern Mexico (Coahuila).

formerly included
 Brickelliastrum nesomii (B.L.Turner) R.M.King & H.Rob., see Steviopsis nesomii B.L.Turner
 Brickelliastrum villarrealii R.M.King & H.Rob., see Steviopsis nesomii B.L.Turner

References

External links
photo of herbarium specimen at Missouri Botanical Garden, collected in New Mexico, type specimen of Brickelliastrum fendleri
Vascular Plants of the Gila Wilderness
Calphotos photo gallery, University of California

Eupatorieae
Monotypic Asteraceae genera
Flora of Coahuila
Flora of the Southwestern United States